"Try It Baby" is a slow blues ballad recorded by American soul singer Marvin Gaye, released on the Tamla label in 1964. The ballad was written and produced by Gaye's brother-in-law, Motown chairman Berry Gordy.

Background
The ballad talked of a woman who was "moving up" and "leaving (her man) behind". To help him along the way, the Temptations (fresh off scoring their first few hits) assisted Gaye in the track providing background vocals.

Cash Box described it as "a tantalizing, chorus-backed rhythm shuffler that Marvin does up in winning style."

Chart history
"Try It Baby" reached number 15 on the pop singles chart and number six on the R&B singles chart.

Cover versions
"Try It Baby" was covered in 1968 as a joint effort by Diana Ross & the Supremes and the Temptations.  Featuring Melvin Franklin, Diana Ross, and Paul Williams on leads, the track was included on the 1968 LP Diana Ross & the Supremes Join the Temptations, their first of four joint albums.

Personnel

Marvin Gaye version 
Lead vocals by Marvin Gaye
Background vocals by the Temptations: Paul Williams, Eddie Kendricks, David Ruffin, Melvin Franklin and Otis Williams
 Trumpet solo by Maurice Davis
 Instrumentation by the Funk Brothers

Supremes/Temptations version
Lead vocals by Diana Ross, Paul Williams and Melvin Franklin
 Background Vocals by Otis Williams, Melvin Franklin, Eddie Kendricks, Paul Williams, Dennis Edwards, and the Andantes
Instrumentation by Los Angeles session musicians

References

1964 singles
1968 singles
Marvin Gaye songs
The Supremes songs
The Temptations songs
Songs written by Berry Gordy
Song recordings produced by Berry Gordy
1964 songs
Tamla Records singles